Sporting Union Agen Football is a French association football club founded in 1922. They are based in the town of Agen and their home stadium is the Parc Municipal des Sports. As of the 2009–10 season, they play in the Championnat de France amateur 2 Group F.

External links
 

1922 establishments in France
Agen
Sport in Agen
Football clubs in Nouvelle-Aquitaine